The 1979 Houston Oilers season was the franchise's 20th overall and the tenth in the National Football League. The franchise scored 362 points while the defense gave up 331 points. Their record of 11 wins and 5 losses resulted in a second-place finish in the AFC Central Division. The Oilers appeared once on Monday Night Football on December 10, 1979 where the sports promotion Luv ya Blue was launched and returned to the AFC Championship Game for the second consecutive year. Earl Campbell would lead the NFL in rushing for the second consecutive year and set a franchise record for most touchdowns in a season with 19. The Oilers would make the playoffs again as a wild card. In the wild card game, they beat the Denver Broncos 13-7, and then defeated the San Diego Chargers 17-14 in San Diego to reach their second straight AFC Championship game. They played the Pittsburgh Steelers, who a year earlier had eliminated them 34-5 in the previous AFC Championship game. The Oilers lost the game 27-13. The game included a controversial moment in which wide receiver Mike Renfro had a touchdown called back after the referees of the game took a long time to decide the ruling on the field. The call went down as one of the most controversial calls in NFL history.

The Oilers franchise would not do so again for twenty seasons, by which time they had re-located and become the Tennessee Titans, while Houston's current NFL team has yet to advance past the divisional round.

Offseason

NFL draft

Personnel

Staff

Roster

Pre season

Schedule

Regular season

Schedule

Standings

Regular Season Game summaries

Week 1 (Sunday, September 2, 1979): at Washington Redskins

Point spread: 
 Over/Under: 
 Time of Game:

Week 2 at Pittsburgh Steelers

Week 3 vs. Kansas City Chiefs

Week 4 at Cincinnati Bengals

Week 5 vs. Cleveland Browns

Week 6 (Sunday, October 7, 1979): vs. St. Louis Cardinals

Point spread: 
 Over/Under: 
 Time of Game:

Week 7 at Baltimore Colts

Week 8 at Seattle Seahawks

Week 9 vs. New York Jets

Week 10 at Miami Dolphins

Week 11 vs. Oakland Raiders

Week 12 vs. Cincinnati Bengals

Week 13 (Thursday, November 22, 1979): at Dallas Cowboys

Point spread: 
 Over/Under: 
 Time of Game: 

Earl Campbell 33 Rush, 195 Yds

Week 14 at Cleveland Browns

Week 15 vs. Pittsburgh Steelers

Week 16 (Sunday, December 16, 1979): vs. Philadelphia Eagles

Point spread: 
 Over/Under: 
 Time of Game: 3 hours, 15 minutes

Postseason

Playoffs

AFC Wild Card vs. Denver Broncos

The Oilers managed to shut down the Broncos offense for most of the game en route to a 13–7 win.

AFC Divisional Playoff at San Diego Chargers

The Oilers offense, playing without starting quarterback Dan Pastorini, receiver Ken Burrough, and running back Earl Campbell, could only generate 259 yards compared to San Diego's 385.  But they still won the game, largely due to the effort of rookie safety Vernon Perry, who set a playoff record with 4 interceptions as the Oilers defeated the Chargers, 17–14.  In his first career playoff game, Chargers future Hall of Fame quarterback Dan Fouts threw for 333 yards, but was intercepted 5 times.

AFC Championship Game at Pittsburgh Steelers

The Steelers held the Oilers to only 24 rushing yards, but were also aided by a controversial non-touchdown call on Mike Renfro to come away with a 27–13 win.

Awards and records
 Earl Campbell, NFL Rushing Leader, (1,697)
 Earl Campbell,  1979 NFL MVP
 Earl Campbell, PFWA NFL MVP (1979)
 Earl Campbell, Pro Bowl selection 1979
 Earl Campbell, All-Pro selection 1979
 Earl Campbell, NEA NFL MVP (1979)
 Earl Campbell, NFL Offensive Player of the Year (1979)
 Earl Campbell, 1979 Bert Bell Award
 Earl Campbell, Houston Oilers record, Most Touchdowns in a Season (19)
Mike Reinfeldt, NFL Interception Leader, 12

Milestones
 Earl Campbell, 2nd 1,000 yard rushing season
 Earl Campbell, 2nd NFL Rushing Title

References

External links
 1979 Houston Oilers at Pro-Football-Reference.com

Houston Oilers
Houston Oilers seasons
Houston